Naraoka is a Japanese surname. Notable people with the surname include:

, Japanese badminton player
, Japanese racewalker
, Japanese actress

Japanese-language surnames